The Girl from Nowhere is a 2012 French fantasy drama film written and directed by Jean-Claude Brisseau. The film had its world premiere on 8 August 2012 at the 65th Locarno Festival, where it won the Golden Leopard. It was released theatrically in France on 6 February 2013 by Les Acacias.

Cast
  as Dora
 Claude Morel as Denis, the doctor friend
 Jean-Claude Brisseau as Michel Deviliers
  as Lise Villers, the former student
  as the fool
 Anne Berry as death
  as performer

References

External links
 

2012 films
2012 drama films
2012 fantasy films
2010s fantasy drama films
2010s French-language films
Films directed by Jean-Claude Brisseau
Films shot in Paris
French fantasy drama films
2010s French films